DTTX may refer to:
 Sfax – Thyna International Airport
 A reporting mark of the TTX Company
 DTTX a rapper